András Serfőző (5 May 1950 – 12 April 2021) was a Hungarian politician.

Biography
He then worked as a legal advisor at the Agricultural Producers' Cooperative. In 1981, he passed the bar and became a judge for the Nógrád County Registry Court in 1989.

In 1994, Serfőző was elected to serve in the National Assembly as a member of the Hungarian Socialist Party, representing the Individual Constituency Nógrád County No. 3. He served on the Committee on Constitutional Affairs and the Committee on Agriculture while on the National Assembly, where he served until 2006. From 2006 to 2011, he was then a county councilor.

András Serfőző died on 12 April 2021 at the age of 70.

References

1950 births
2021 deaths
Hungarian judges
Members of the National Assembly of Hungary (1994–1998)
Members of the National Assembly of Hungary (1998–2002)
Members of the National Assembly of Hungary (2002–2006)
Hungarian Socialist Party politicians
Eötvös Loránd University alumni
People from Nógrád County